Frederick Heinrich Wilhelm Meyer (November 6, 1872 – January 6, 1961) was a  designer and art educator prominent in the Arts and Crafts Movement. He was a long-time resident of the San Francisco Bay Area.

Early years
Meyer was born near Hamelin, Germany, on November 6, 1872, into a family whose occupations were dominated by furniture craftsmen and weavers. He apprenticed as a cabinetmaker before he immigrated in 1888 to Fresno, California, where he worked in a large commercial nursery. In about 1890, he enrolled at the Cincinnati Technical School and two years later transferred to the Pennsylvania Museum and School of Industrial Art. On November 7, 1893, he became a naturalized citizen of the United States of America. In the spring of 1895 he traveled to Germany, completed the program at the Royal Academy of Berlin for Fine Arts and Mechanical Sciences (aka Prussian Academy of Arts), and returned to the Pennsylvania Museum School, where he was awarded a master's degree.

Career 
Between 1898 and 1902 Meyer held the post of Supervisor of Art for the public schools in Stockton, California. In 1900, he hired as assistant art supervisor William S. Rice, whom he had met in Pennsylvania; Rice was promoted to Meyer's job in 1902. He and his wife later relocated to Berkeley, California, in fall of 1902, where he was hired as an “Instructor of Descriptive Geometry” (i.e. mechanical drawing) at the University of California. A year later was appointed Professor of Applied Arts and head of the Department of Industrial Design at San Francisco's Mark Hopkins Institute of Art, which was administered by U.C. Berkeley. In addition, he opened the Craftsman's Shop in San Francisco and designed custom furniture for prestigious clients, including the: Phoebe Hearst estate at Wyntoon (in association with Bernard Maybeck), California Building at the 1904 Louisiana Purchase Exposition in St. Louis, Faculty Club at U.C. Berkeley, and Sequoia Club in San Francisco.

In October 1905 he was elected president of the California Guild of Arts and Crafts and his wife became its treasurer; they held both positions for two years. After the devastating San Francisco earthquake and fine in April 1906, which destroyed the Mark Hopkins Institute, he briefly traveled to Europe.

Founding of his arts and crafts school
Meyer expressed his dream of a school that would fuse the practical and ideal goals of craftsmen, designers, and artists, integrated into both theory and practice.

Meyer founded the School of the California Guild of Arts and Crafts in June 1907 with its first location in the Studio Building, one block from the U.C. Berkeley campus. He had just $45.00 in cash, access to three classrooms and 43 students. The following year his school was renamed the California School of Arts and Crafts (CSAC) and briefly relocated to the space over a billiard parlor. In 1910, to accommodate the ever-expanding student body, the CSCA took over the campus of Berkley's old Commercial High School, where they remained until their move in 1923-24 to a larger facility in Oakland on Broadway. The school was renamed the California College of Arts and Crafts (CCAC) in 1936  and opened a second campus in San Francisco in 1996. The school's name was changed for a fourth time in 2003 to the California College of the Arts (CCA). The school developed an international reputation because of Meyer's high standards and the renowned faculty that he hired, including Xavier Martinez, William S. Rice, Perham Wilhelm Nahl, Beniamino Bufano, Isabelle Clark Percy West, and Hamilton A. Wolf. Meyer became a popular figure though his many public lectures and sponsorship of exhibitions and charities.

Meyer led the college until his retirement in 1944, when he was named President-Emeritus.

Personal life 
In Stockton, Meyer met and married in June 1902 the Boston-born Laetitia Summerville. The couple relocated that fall to Berkeley, California.

Frederick Meyer died at the age of 88 on January 6, 1961, in Oakland.

References

German furniture designers
American furniture designers
American art educators
1872 births
1961 deaths
German emigrants to the United States
San Francisco Art Institute faculty
University of the Arts (Philadelphia) alumni
California College of the Arts